The Republic of Gupta: A Story of State Capture  is a 2017 book by South African investigative journalist Pieter-Louis Myburgh.

Background and synopsis
The Republic of Gupta investigates the business activities of the Gupta family and how they came to hold a position of such power and influence over the President of South Africa, Jacob Zuma. It is an exposé of the many controversial business activities of the Gupta family from cricket to computers to newspapers and television. The book explores their conflict with Public Protector Thuli Madonsela and with the Finance Minister Pravin Gordhan which led to his dismissal by Zuma. The book also investigates the other close links between the Gupta family and others within South African politics and society.

Reception
In The Sunday Times Graeme Hosken praises the book as "fascinating". Hosken writes that Myburgh "discloses their thirst for control and wealth through outrageous manipulation".

References

2017 non-fiction books
Deep politics
Investigative journalism
Penguin Books books
Non-fiction books about organized crime
Jacob Zuma
Works about corruption
Corruption in South Africa
African National Congress
Books about the African National Congress